The Health Research Council of New Zealand (HRC) is a Crown agency of the New Zealand Government.  
It is responsible for managing the government's investment in health research for the public good.
The HRC was established under the Health Research Council Act 1990. Since January 2016, HRC's board has been chaired by Dr Lester Levy. The Council's Chief Executive since February 2020 is Professor Sunny Collings.

The statutory functions of the HRC include:
 administering funds in relation to national health research policy
 advising the Minister of Health
 supporting health research and those engaged in health research in New Zealand
 undertaking consultation to establish priorities in health research
 promoting and disseminating the results of health research.

The Council awards the Liley Medal annually for recent research which has made an outstanding contribution to the health and medical sciences. The Council also awards the Beaven Medal annually for excellence in translational health research.

Before the establishment of the HRC, medical research in New Zealand was mostly overseen by the Medical Research Council of New Zealand (MRCNZ; 1937–1990). Jim Hodge was the director of the MRCNZ from 1972 to 1991.

References

External links
Official HRC website

Funding bodies of New Zealand
New Zealand Crown agents
Medical and health organisations based in New Zealand
1990 establishments in New Zealand
Government agencies established in 1990